Journey in Satchidananda is the fourth solo album by Alice Coltrane. Four of the album's tracks were recorded at the Coltrane home studios in Dix Hills, New York, in November 1970, while the remaining track was recorded live at the Village Gate in July of that year. It was released by Impulse! Records in 1971. On the album, Coltrane appears on piano and harp, and is joined by saxophonist Pharoah Sanders, bassists Cecil McBee (studio tracks) and Charlie Haden (live track), and drummer Rashied Ali. Vishnu Wood also appears on oud on the live track, while the studio recordings also feature Majid Shabazz on bells and tambourine and Tulsi on tanpura.

Journey in Satchidananda is important in that it marks a transition between Coltrane's first three recordings and her subsequent releases, which reveal a more personalized outlook. The album's title and title track reflect the influence of Swami Satchidananda, to whom Coltrane had become close while being his disciple.

"Shiva-Loka", or "realm of Shiva", refers to the realm of the third member of the Hindu trinity, the "dissolver of creation". "Stopover Bombay" refers to a five-week stay in India and Sri Lanka on which Coltrane was due to go in December 1970. "Something About John Coltrane" is based on themes by her late husband, John Coltrane. "Isis and Osiris" demonstrates Coltrane's interest in Middle Eastern and North African music and culture. The presence of the tamboura, played by Tulsi, reflects Coltrane's interest in Indian classical music and religion.

Reception

The editors of AllMusic awarded the album a full 5 stars, and Thom Jurek stated, "this is a remarkable album, and necessary for anyone interested in the development of modal and experimental jazz. It's also remarkably accessible".

The album was ranked number 446 in the 2020 edition of Rolling Stone magazine's 500 Greatest Albums of All Time list, and the editors called it "a meditative bliss-out like jazz had never seen: part earthy blues and part ethereal mantra, and a potent influence on sonic seekers from Radiohead to Coltrane's grandnephew Flying Lotus."

Pitchfork'''s Josephine Livingstone noted that the album "pays full tribute to the transformation that [Coltrane] underwent in the late 1960s—as a human being and artist," and commented: "this is a record as much about the soul as it is about skilled orchestration... the very texture of Journey is defined by transition, process, and flow. Its music has no beginning or end. Instead... Coltrane is working with the principle of looping and transcendence."

Writing for Treble, and referring to the loss of Coltrane's husband, Emma Bauchner remarked: "Journey in Satchidananda feels like a culmination of sorts: a collision of loss with newfound understanding and self-expression. The music occupies the liminal spaces between East and West, post-bop and raga, grief and healing, consciousness and transcendence... More than anything, Journey in Satchidanandas magnificent soundscapes carry a deep sense of healing, reflecting Coltrane's own journey and subsequent transformation in the face of grief."

In an article for The Guardian, Jennifer Lucy Allan described the album as "a mid-point between the modal and meditative, where all the parts of her musical being and biography are present," and wrote: "It ought strictly to be called fusion music, with elements taken from Indian music and combined with western traditions, but in Coltrane’s music there are no visible joins – all is bound in cosmic opulence."

Colleen Murphy of Classical Album Sundays described the album as "a truly deep, far out, transformative listening experience," and remarked: "you may also temporarily achieve a higher state of consciousness while listening to this album. Take the journey."

NPR's Sydnee Monday stated: "Almost 50 years after Journey In Satchidananda was released, the album remains a vision of universal healing, spiritual self-preservation in times of trouble and the god that appears when you seek her out."

Track listingSide A"Journey in Satchidananda" – 6:39
"Shiva-Loka" – 6:37
"Stopover Bombay" – 2:54Side B"Something About John Coltrane" – 9:44
"Isis and Osiris" – 11:49

All compositions by Alice Coltrane.
Tracks A1–B1 recorded at the Coltrane home studio, Dix Hills, New York, on November 8, 1970; track B2 recorded live at The Village Gate, New York City, on July 4, 1970.

Personneltracks A1 to B1Alice Coltrane – piano, harp
Pharoah Sanders – soprano saxophone, percussion
Cecil McBee – double bass
Rashied Ali – drums
Tulsi – tanpura
Majid Shabazz – bells, tambourinetrack B2'''
Alice Coltrane – harp
Pharoah Sanders – soprano saxophone, percussion
Rashied Ali – drums
Charlie Haden – bass
Vishnu Wood – oud

References

Alice Coltrane albums
1971 albums
Musical tributes
Impulse! Records albums
Albums produced by Alice Coltrane
Spiritual jazz albums